Cameron Holdsworth Parker  (born 14 April 1932) is a former Scottish businessman and a former Lord Lieutenant of Renfrewshire. Parker has been chairman and served on the board of engineering companies, including British Shipbuilders and was a Liveryman of the Worshipful Company of Shipwrights in the 1980s.

References

1932 births
Living people
Officers of the Order of the British Empire
Lord-Lieutenants of Renfrewshire
Commanders of the Royal Victorian Order
Scottish businesspeople